Paul Simms (born 1966) is an American television writer and producer. He is known for creating NewsRadio and contributing to The Larry Sanders Show,  Flight of the Conchords and Atlanta.

Early life and career

Simms spent much of his childhood living abroad in Pakistan and Saudi Arabia where his parents were school teachers. He later returned to the United States and graduated from Harvard University where he wrote for the Harvard Lampoon and was a part-time student security guard, often during the night shift. After graduating, he worked for Spy magazine from 1988 to 1990.

Television

He began his career in television writing for Late Night with David Letterman in 1990. Simms later wrote for the HBO program The Larry Sanders Show. He was the creator and head writer for the NBC sitcom NewsRadio. More recently, he has directed and produced the HBO series Flight of the Conchords and the FX series Atlanta. He has contributed pieces to The New Yorker and also wrote a sitcom pilot, Beach Lane, starring Matthew Broderick, for executive producer Lorne Michaels. His production company is 343 Incorporated. In 2017, he signed a deal with FX.

Filmography

Bibliography

References

External links
 
 1989 audio interview of Paul Simms at Wired for Books.org by Don Swaim
 A Paul Simms humor piece in the New Yorker

1966 births
Living people
American television producers
American television writers
The Harvard Lampoon alumni
American male television writers
The New Yorker people